Susanne Ceder (born 30 June 1967) is a Swedish retired ice hockey player. She played with the Swedish national team from the beginning of women's international ice hockey competition in 1988 until her retirement in 2000. With the team she played in four IIHF European Women Championships (where she won gold in 1996 and silver in 1989, 1991, and 1993) and five IIHF World Women's Championships, placing 4th four times. She served as team captain at the inaugural women's ice hockey tournament at the 1998 Winter Olympic Games.

References

External links
 

1967 births
Living people
Swedish women's ice hockey forwards
Olympic ice hockey players of Sweden
Ice hockey players at the 1998 Winter Olympics
People from Örnsköldsvik Municipality
Kiekko-Espoo Naiset players
Espoo Blues Naiset players
Keravan Shakers players
Sportspeople from Västernorrland County
20th-century Swedish women